ISO 12006 is within the discipline of architecture for building construction. 

 ISO 12006 "Building construction - Organization of information about construction works" is an international standard dealing with structuring of information for construction. It has two parts:
ISO 12006-2:2015 "Building construction - Organization of information about construction works - Part 2: Framework for classification of information"
ISO 12006-3:2007 "Building construction - Organization of information about construction works - Part 3: Framework for object-oriented information" also known as BuildingSMART Data Dictionary or International Framework for Dictionaries (IFD) Library.

Classification of project stages:
inception/ procurement
 feasibility
 outline proposals, programme preparation
 scheme detail/ costing
 detail design/ costing
 production information and bills of quantities preparation
 tender action
 construction preparation
 construction operations on site
 completion
 feedback

See also
Building code
Civil engineering
List of ISO standards

References

12006